Louis Bernard Brodsky (December 25, 1883 - April 29, 1970) was a magistrate in The Tombs court in New York City known for the acquittal of the six men involved in the anti-Nazi SS Bremen riot in 1935 and for a progressive ruling regarding dancers and nudity in April 1935.

Background
Of Jewish heritage, he was born on Christmas Day, December 25, 1883 in the Russian Empire. Brodsky graduated from the New York University Law School in 1900. He was admitted to the New York Bar in 1901.

Career
Brodsky was mostly involved in commercial cases as a trial lawyer. He was named a magistrate in 1924 by Mayor John F. Hylan. He filled an unexpired term and was reappointed to a 10-year-term by Mayor James J. Walker. He retired in 1939.

Brodsky was chairman of the National Hebrew Orphan Asylum, honorary president of the Hebrew Day and Night Nursery, director of the Home of Old Israel and Hebrew Orphan Home, and a trustee of the Israel Zion Hospital of Brooklyn, New York.

Personal life and death
Brodsky resided at 169 Ocean Drive West in Stamford, Connecticut in August 1952. On August 25, 1952 he was hit by a car outside the railroad station in Stamford. He sustained injuries to his head, left hand, and left leg but was reported to be in good condition.

Brodsky died at Mount Sinai Hospital in Manhattan, New York City on April 29, 1970 at the age of 86. He resided at 465 Park Avenue at the time of his death. He was survived by his wife, Rose, a daughter, Mrs. Janet G. Frumberg, and a grandson.

1935 Rulings

Nudity case ruling
Brodsky dropped charges against Louise Wilson, 24, of 15 West 65th Street, Manhattan and Dorothy Sims, 22, of 450 West 150th Street, Manhattan. The two women were arrested by a policeman for indecency while performing before an audience of 101 men at a waiters' club at 80 Greenwich Street. Brodsky dismissed the women from court, saying "nudity is no longer considered indecent in uptown nightclubs and theaters." The women left the club without even a fan to cover them. Brodsky also released the 101 men who attended the performance who were detained at the police station overnight.

SS Bremen verdict
Brodsky's most noteworthy decision came in a case involving six men arrested during a riot which occurred on July 26, 1935. He freed five of the six individuals who tore the Nazi swastika from the SS Bremen (1928). Brodsky compared the emblem to a pirate flag. He refused an apology even though German newspapers and government officials demanded one. United States Secretary of State Cordell Hull sent to Nazi Germany a note of "regret" for Brodsky's decision.

References

New York (state) lawyers
1970 deaths
New York University School of Law alumni
Place of birth missing
1883 births
20th-century American lawyers
American people of Russian-Jewish descent
Jewish American attorneys